Johann Karl Zeune (29 October 1736 – 8 November 1788) was a German academic and philologist.

1736 births
1788 deaths
Academic staff of Leipzig University
German philologists